Chanat-la-Mouteyre is a commune in the Puy-de-Dôme department in Auvergne-Rhône-Alpes in central France.

Twin towns
Chanat is twinned with the town of Cappoquin in Ireland.

See also
Communes of the Puy-de-Dôme department

References

Chanatlamouteyre